Mounts Bay Road is a major road in Perth, Western Australia, extending southwest from the central business district along the north bank of the Swan River, at the base of Kings Park.

Route description
Mounts Bay Road runs between William Street and Winthrop Avenue in Crawley, continuing towards Fremantle as Stirling Highway and linking Perth with the University of Western Australia (UWA) and the riverside suburbs of Nedlands and Claremont. The road circles around the northern and western sides of The Narrows Interchange, which was built on reclaimed land. The interchange connects to the Mitchell and Kwinana freeways, and the Narrows Bridge. To the east it travels to William Street and The Esplanade, along northern side of the Perth Convention Centre and the Elizabeth Quay Bus Station. South-west of the interchange the Point Lewis Rotary connects the road with an entrance ramp to the Kwinana Freeway southbound, and westbound traffic from Riverside Drive (which is one-way at that point). Mounts Bay Road then follows the Swan River estuary, and forms the southern and southeastern boundary for Kings Park. It ends at an intersection with Winthrop Avenue and Stirling Highway, overlooked by UWA's Winthrop Hall.

Mounts Bay Road is also home to the Old Swan Brewery, as well as a number of expensive high rise apartments and hotels overlooking the river.

History
 Mounts Bay Road was named after Mounts Bay in 1845, the body of water in the Swan River Estuary that was infilled for the construction of the Narrows Interchange, and the road follows the boundary of the bay at the Narrows. Prior to its new naming, it was known as Morgan Street after J. Morgan, the Resident Magistrate of Perth in 1832, who built the original road.

It was, during the era of trams in Perth, a notable location of tram derailment.

Main Roads Western Australia installed roundabout metering traffic lights on Mounts Bay Road's eastern approach to the Point Lewis Rotary during 2013. The signals have the usual red and yellow signal phases, plus a blank phase for proceeding through the roundabout, following the normal roundabout the rules. The signals are activated when queue detectors on the Kwinana Freeway on-ramp and Mounts Bay Road southbound, out of Perth, indicate there is sufficient traffic congestion. Eastbound traffic on Mounts Bay Road is expected to experience only minimal delay, while the roundabout intersection is expected to operate more efficiently, preventing gridlock and reducing the number of crashes. Construction started in October 2013, with the roundabout metering signals beginning operation on 9 November	2013.

Future

The City of Perth plan to upgrade Mounts Bay Road to accommodate increasing traffic demand and improve accessibility. Their plan would reintroduce two-way traffic between Mill and William Streets, which is currently limited to eastbound traffic. A new shared pedestrian and cycle path would be constructed along that same section, and the median-side lanes would be converted into bus priority lanes. Existing onroad parking would be retained, as would existing trees. The plan proposes widening the southbound carriageway into the adjacent Sir John Oldham Park. The required amount of land is described as "small portions along the edge". The project is still in the planning phase.

See also

Notes

References
 Gervas, Stan (2003) Sunday mornings in Perth Maylands [W.A.] : Gervas Books.  – pp. 160–168

Further reading

 Bateson, Fred W. (1943)  Mounts Bay Road (1885 to 1893) Typescript held in Battye Library
 The West Australian (1896) The influx of population. Report of tent city located along Mounts Bay Road. 4 February 1896, p. 6,

Streets in Perth central business district, Western Australia
Perth waterfront
Crawley, Western Australia